Brazil competed at the 2017 World Games in Wroclaw, Poland, from July 20, 2017 to July 30, 2017.

Competitors

Beach handball 

Brazil won the gold medal in both the men's tournament and women's tournament.

Fistball
Brazil has qualified at the 2017 World Games in the Fistball Men Team event.

Gymnastic

Trampoline
Brazil has qualified at the 2017 World Games:</ref> At the 2017 World Games, she again won gold in the same category.

Women's Individual Double Mini Trampoline - 1 quota

Powerlifting

Equipped - Heavyweight
Brazil won the gold medal in the tournament through athlete Ana Castellain.

References 

Nations at the 2017 World Games
2017 in Brazilian sport
2017